Nostradamus: The Last Prophecy is an adventure video game released in 2007 that was developed by Kheops, Mzone and Totm. It was a co-production by Elektrogames, Kheops Studio, MC2, Mzone and Totm, and is published in the US by MC2.

Gameplay

Plot
The game takes place in March 1566, in Salon-de-Provence, France, when the court of  King Charles IX is touring France. His mother, Catherine de Medici, who is the victim of strange curse, lost power 3 years previously. She decides to pay a visit to her doctor and astrologer, Michel de Nostre-Dame, better known as Nostradamus; but he is too fatigued to help her. It is his daughter Madeleine, under the false identity of her brother César, who offers her services to the queen mother. The player alternates between Madeleine's true self or disguised as César, depending on the situation to search through political scheming and ancestral prophecies.

Development

Reception 
The game received a rating of 70% off Metacritic based on reviews from 10 critics.

Emily Balistrieri of IGN wrote that the game wouldn't appeal to the player if they didn't feel like learning about astrology.

References

External links 
 Nostradamus: The Last Prophecy at Microïds
 Nostradamus: The Last Prophecy official website
 Nostradamus: The Last Prophecy at MobyGames

2007 video games
Adventure games
IOS games
MacOS games
Microïds games
Video games developed in France
Video games featuring female protagonists
Video games set in France
Windows games
Kheops Studio games